The Ibie is a  long river in the Ardèche département, southeastern France. It flows generally south-southwest, through the northern part of the Côtes du Vivarais AOC.

Communes along its course
This list is ordered from source to mouth:
Ardèche: Saint-Jean-le-Centenier, Villeneuve-de-Berg, Saint-Maurice-d'Ibie, Rochecolombe, Lagorce, Vallon-Pont-d'Arc

References

Rivers of France
Rivers of Ardèche
Rivers of Auvergne-Rhône-Alpes